A Retrospective is a compilation album by rapper KRS-One. It features many songs that were originally released under the Boogie Down Productions title, and some songs released under the KRS-One title. It is composed of previously released material.  The track "Essays on BDP-Ism" was the last track ever produced by Scott La Rock.

No tracks are included from Sex and Violence, the final Boogie Down Productions studio album.

Track listing

Extra Track Information
"You Must Learn", "Jack of Spades" and "Why Is That?" are all co-produced by D-Nice, D-Square, Rebekah Foster, Sidney Mills and Spaceman

Charts

References

KRS-One albums
2000 compilation albums
Albums produced by DJ Premier